Erik Jinesjö Karlsson (born 28 July 1994) is a Swedish professional ice hockey forward who is currently playing with Modo Hockey of the HockeyAllsvenskan (Allsv). Karlsson was drafted in the fourth round, 99th overall, in the 2012 NHL Entry Draft by the Carolina Hurricanes.

Playing career
Karlsson developed as a youth in his native Sweden with the Frölunda HC organization. He played in his first Elitserien game on 18 December 2012, against AIK. On May 27, 2014, Karlsson was signed to a two-year, entry-level contract with the Carolina Hurricanes.

After two seasons in the American Hockey League with the Hurricanes affiliate, the Charlotte Checkers, Karlsson was continuing to struggle at the North American game. As an impending restricted free agent, Karlsson opted to return to Sweden in agreeing to a one-year contract with Timrå IK of the Allsvenskan on May 11, 2017. His NHL rights were later relinquished by the Hurricanes.

Serving as an Alternate captain with Timrå in the 2017–18 season, Karlsson produced 9 goals and 28 points in 52 games. As a free agent Karlsson opted to leave Sweden, signing a one-year contract with Finnish club, KooKoo of the Liiga, on April 9, 2018.

Personal
Erik is the younger brother of Anton Karlsson, who also currently plays for Storhamar Dragons in the Eliteserien (Norway).

Career statistics

Regular season and playoffs

International

References

External links

1994 births
Living people
Carolina Hurricanes draft picks
Charlotte Checkers (2010–) players
Florida Everblades players
Frölunda HC players
Karlskrona HK players
KooKoo players
Modo Hockey players
Sportspeople from Västra Götaland County
Swedish ice hockey forwards
Timrå IK players